Grace May North (Monfort) (February 1, 1876 – July 23, 1960) was a newspaper journalist and author of novels for children and adolescents, stories which featured both girl and boy protagonists. She wrote primarily under her birth/'maiden' name Grace May North  although some of her later novels were also republished under the pen-name Carol Norton.

Biography
Grace May North was born in Utica, New York on February 1, 1876.  During her career she is known to have worked as a newspaper journalist.  She resided in New York City where she worked at the Webster Branch of the New York Public Library from 1910 to 1915. Her duties included running a story telling club for girls, and doing story telling in schools and institutions. She moved west to Nevada, residing in Carson City.  Subsequently she moved to Santa Barbara, California. Grace died in San Luis Obispo, California on July 23, 1960, and was buried in Halcyon Cemetery, Halcyon, California.

Career
North wrote most of her novels from ca. 1918 to ca. 1935.  She produced two series of novels for adolescent girls (roughly 1919-1924), and went on to write a number of individual novels, also for girls.  Many of the later were also subsequently republished under the pen-name Carol Norton.  In addition to her female-themed young-adult works she was also the author of, among others, three books in the X Bar X Boys series for adolescent boys and the Southwestern Stories for Children series for younger children (unpublished).

Works

Adele Doring series
 Adele Doring of the Sunnyside Club (1919; Adele Doring, #1)
 Adele Doring on a Ranch (1920; Adele Doring, #2)
 Adele Doring at Boarding-School (1921; Adele Doring, #3)
 Adele Doring in Camp (1922; Adele Doring, #4)
 Adele Doring at Vineyard Valley (1923; Adele Doring, #5)

Virginia Davis series
 Virginia at Vine Haven (1924)
 Virginia's Adventure Club (1924)
 Virginia of V.M. Ranch (1924)
 Virginia's Ranch Neighbors (1924)
 Virginia's Romance (1924)

Individual books
 The Bylow Squirrel Boys (1915;Bedtime Rhymes) 
 Meg of Mystery Mountain (1926)
 Nan of the Gypsies (1926)
 Rilla of the Lighthouse (1926)
 Bobs, a girl detective (1928)
 Sisters (1928);
 The Seven Sleuths’ Club (1928)
 The Phantom Yacht  (1928)
 The Phantom Town Mystery (reprinted? 1933)
 Dixie Martin, The Girl of Woodford's Cañon (1924)

X Bar X Boys series
 The X Bar X Boys at the Strange Rodeo (1935; X Bar X Boys #14) 
 The X Bar X Boys Hunting the Prize Mustangs (1937; X Bar X Boys #16)
 The X Bar X Boys at Triangle Mine (1938; X Bar X Boys #17)

Family

Grace was the daughter of Eugene Northrup and Adele N. Harrington.

She married widower William Nelson Monfort in Santa Barbara on August 3, 1923.

One of her step-sons, Donald L. Monfort, was killed in World War II.  Her husband died in San Diego, California on January 13, 1957, and was buried in Halcyon Cemetery, Halcyon, California. Her other step-son, Gordon W. Monfort, died in Fresno in 1985.

References

External links

 
 
 
 
 
 Grace May North, on the LibraryThing wiki—bibliography and basic bio.

1876 births
1960 deaths
American children's writers
Writers from Utica, New York
American women journalists
American women novelists
American women children's writers
Journalists from New York (state)
Novelists from New York (state)